Swartzia littlei is a species of flowering plant in the family Fabaceae. It is endemic and found only in Ecuador. Its natural habitat is subtropical or tropical moist lowland forests.

References

Further reading

littlei
Endemic flora of Ecuador
Endangered plants
Taxonomy articles created by Polbot